De Phoenix, (also De Phenix or De Fenix) is a name given to some windmills in the Netherlands. The name is usually an indication that a previous mill on the site burnt down.

De Fenix
 De Jong Fenix, Leeuwarden, a windmill in Friesland

De Phenix
 De Phenix, Dokkum, a windmill in Friesland
 De Phenix, Leeuwarden, a windmill in Friesland
 De Phenix, Marrum, a windmill in Friesland
 De Phenix, Nes, a windmill in Friesland

Phoenix
 Phoenix, Zuidwolde, a windmill in Groningen